The Bojana (Cyrillic: Бојана) river, also known as Buna, is a  river in Albania and Montenegro which flows into the Adriatic Sea.

Etymology 
The modern Albanian name of the river delivers from Illyrian Barbanna and follows Albanian phonetic sound rules.

Course

The river in Albania 
The river used to be longer, but due to a rise in the level of Lake Skadar, the uppermost part of the river is now under the lake's surface. The river initially flows east, but after only few kilometers reaches the city of Shkodër and turns to the south. On the southern outskirts of the city, the river receives its most important tributary, the Great Drin, the greater part of which became its tributary after changing course during a flood in 1858 and now brings more water (352 m³/s) than the Buna itself (320 m³/s). After flowing around the Peak of Tarabosh, it passes through the villages of Zues, Bërdicë, Darragjat, Oblikë, Obot, Shirq, Dajç and Goricë.

Border river and the mouth
After  in Albania, it forms the border between Albania and Montenegro. Settlements include villages of Sveti Đorđe and Reč on the Montenegrin, and Luarzë and Pulaj on the Albanian side. The area surrounding the river in this section is low and marshy, Buna river being the eastern border of the Field of Ulcinj and of the  Long Beach (Velika Plaža) of Ulcinj.

At its mouth into the Adriatic, Buna forms a small delta with two arms, the left one forming the border with Albania, and the right one, with the island between the arms, being part of Montenegro. The island is called Ada Bojana (Ada, the Turkish word for "island", has found its way into the Serbian language). With the neighboring resort of Sveti Nikola ("Saint Nicholas"), it is a major center of nudism along the Adriatic.

The other, smaller island belongs to Albania and is called Franc Jozeph Island or Ada Major. This small island is not artificial such as Ada Bojana but natural. The Island of Franz Joseph frequently receives tourists.

Characteristics 

Lake Skadar, the largest lake in southeastern Europe, at almost sea level, nearby empties into it, draining much of Montenegro. From Albania, and border lands east, its main tributary is the Great Drin. Bojana river ranks second among all tributaries to the Adriatic (measured by average annual discharge) after the Po in Italy.

It is highly navigable and is worked and toured by vessels ranging from motorboats, canal barges up to large tour boats and inland goods barges.

References

Bibliography

 Mala Prosvetina Enciklopedija, Third edition,  Prosveta, 1985, 
 Jovan Đ. Marković,  Enciklopedijski geografski leksikon Jugoslavije, Svjetlost-Sarajevo, 1990, 

Rivers of Albania
Rivers of Montenegro
International rivers of Europe
Geography of Shkodër County
Albania–Montenegro border
 
Ramsar sites in Albania
Border rivers